The Birmingham Bulls are a professional ice hockey team in Pelham, Alabama, that began to play in the 2017–18 season as a member of the Southern Professional Hockey League. The team is named after the previous Birmingham-area teams in the World Hockey Association and East Coast Hockey League.

History
In 1992, Art Clarkson obtained the rights to an East Coast Hockey League (ECHL) franchise for Birmingham and named it after the former World Hockey Association team, the Birmingham Bulls. However, he sold the ECHL team in 1997 and it eventually relocated in 2001. In early 2017, Clarkson began proposing a new Bulls team to begin play due to the increased presence of hockey in the area. Due to arena issues, the team could not play at the Birmingham–Jefferson Convention Complex like the other former teams, but instead settled on the smaller Pelham Civic Center in nearby Pelham, Alabama, in February 2017. The Southern Professional Hockey League (SPHL) announced its approval of the Bulls as an expansion team on April 26, 2017. Longtime ECHL Bulls' player Jamey Hicks was named as the inaugural head coach and director of hockey operations.

In their inaugural season, the team finished second-to-last and missed the playoffs. In their second season, the team improved and had the second best regular season record in the league led by the SPHL's most valuable player Josh Harris, goaltender of the year Mavric Parks, and coach of the year Jamey Hicks. Birmingham advanced in the 2019 playoffs to the championships, but were defeated by the defending champion Huntsville Havoc. After the season, Art Clarkson stepped down as the managing partner of team and died later that year.

The 2019–20 season was curtailed by the COVID-19 pandemic. During the pandemic, head coach Jamey Hicks resigned before the 2020–21 season in order to remain in Canada but was still a consultant for the team. He was replaced by Craig Simchuk.

References

External links
Official website

Ice hockey teams in Alabama
Southern Professional Hockey League teams
Shelby County, Alabama
Ice hockey clubs established in 2017
2017 establishments in Alabama